The QF 3.7-inch AA was Britain's primary heavy anti-aircraft gun during World War II. It was roughly the equivalent of the German Flak 8.8 cm and American 90 mm, but with a slightly larger calibre of 3.7 inches, approximately 94 mm. Production began in 1937 and it was used throughout World War II in all theatres except the Eastern Front. It remained in use after the war until AA guns were replaced by guided missiles beginning in 1957.

The gun was produced in two versions, one mobile and another fixed. The fixed mounting allowed more powerful ammunition, Mk. VI, which gave vastly increased performance. Six variants of the two designs were introduced. The gun was also used as the basis for the Ordnance QF 32-pounder anti-tank gun variant used on the Tortoise heavy assault tank.

History

Background

During World War I, anti-aircraft guns and anti-aircraft gunnery developed rapidly. The British Army eventually adopted the QF 3-inch 20 cwt as the most commonly used type. Shortly before the end of the war, a new QF 3.6 inch gun was accepted for service but the end of the war meant it did not enter production. After the war, all anti-aircraft guns except the three-inch gun were scrapped.

However, the war had shown the possibilities and potential for air attack and lessons had been learned. The British had used AA guns in most theatres in daylight, as well as against night attacks at home. They had also formed an AA Experimental Section during the war and accumulated much data that was subjected to extensive analysis. After an immediate post-war hiatus, the army re-established peacetime anti-aircraft units in 1922. In 1925, the RAF established a new command, Air Defence of Great Britain, and the Royal Artillery's anti-aircraft units were placed under its command.

In 1924–5, the war office published the two-volume Textbook of Anti-Aircraft Gunnery. It included five key recommendations for heavy anti-aircraft (HAA) guns:
Shells of improved ballistic shape with HE fillings and mechanical time fuses
Higher rates of fire assisted by automation
Height finding by long-base optical rangefinders
Centralised control of fire on each gun position, directed by tachymetric instruments, which incorporated the facility to apply corrections of the moment for meteorological and wear factors
More accurate sound-location for the direction of searchlights and to provide plots for barrage fire

Two assumptions underpinned the British approach to HAA fire. First, aimed fire was the primary method and this was enabled by predicting gun data from visually tracking the target with continuous height and range input. Second, that the target would maintain a steady course, speed and height. Mechanical, as opposed to igniferous, time fuses were required because the speed of powder burning varied with height so fuse length was not a simple function of time of flight. Automated fire ensured a constant rate of fire that made it easier to predict where each shell should be individually aimed.

During the 1920s, Vickers developed the Vickers range clock (Predictor No 1), an electro-mechanical computer that took height and range data from an optical rangefinder, applied corrections for non-standard conditions and was used by its operators to visually track a target, its output predicted firing data and fuse setting via the "mag-slip" electrical induction system to dials on each gun in a battery, the gun layers moved the gun to match pointers on the dials. The three-inch AA guns were modified accordingly.

QF 3.7

In 1934, Vickers Armstrong produced a mock-up and proceeded to develop prototypes of the weapon, which was selected and passed acceptance tests in 1936. The weight specification was exceeded, the muzzle velocity not achieved and the mechanical time fuse, No. 206, was still some years from production. The igniferous No. 199 had to be used and its lesser running time limited the effective ceiling. Gun production started the following year.

On 1 January 1938, the British air defences had only 180 anti-aircraft guns larger than 50 mm and most of these were the older 3-inch guns. This number increased to 341 by the September 1938 (Munich Crisis), to 540 in September 1939 (declaration of war), and to 1,140 during the Battle of Britain. Production continued until 1945, averaging 228 guns per month throughout the period. Guns were also manufactured in Australia.

Being a high-velocity gun, with a single charge and firing substantial quantities of ammunition, meant that barrel life could be short and by the end of 1940 there was a barrel shortage. Some of the substantial numbers of spare barrels required were produced in Canada.

In British service, the gun replaced the 3-inch AA gun in HAA batteries and regiments of the Royal Artillery (RA), usually grouped into specialist AA brigades of Anti-Aircraft Command or the field armies. Each regiment usually had three batteries, each of eight guns in two troops. Over 160 of these HAA regiments, RA, plus five of the West African Artillery and two each for the Royal Marines, Hong Kong-Singapore Artillery, Royal Malta Artillery and East African Artillery were eventually formed.  Other World War II users were India (about 14 regiments), Canada (two or three regiments) and Australia (equivalent of about 13 regiments).

Description

Gun

Two versions of the gun were produced. One used a travelling carriage, for use by batteries in the field army. This consisted of a wheeled carriage (Carriage Mk I or Mk III) with four folding outrigger trails and levelling jacks. The wheels were lifted off the ground or removed when the gun was brought into action.

The other used a travelling platform (Mounting Mk II) with detachable wheels for guns to be used in static positions but which could be re-positioned. The mounting had a pedestal that was fixed to a solidly constructed, preferably concrete, platform on the ground. In 1944, it was found that a temporary platform built from railway sleepers and rails was adequate for the static guns, making them considerably easier to re-deploy without the cost and delay of constructing new concrete platforms. These were known as Pile platforms, after the head of Anti-Aircraft Command, General Frederick Alfred Pile.

In both cases, the saddle rotated 360° on the carriage or pedestal and provided elevation up to 80°. An AEC Matador was the normal gun tractor. There were six marks of ordnance (the barrel and breech assembly) and a few marks of carriage of both versions, some using letter suffixes. The carriage included the recoil system, laying arrangements, fuse setting and loading machinery. The Mk IIC mounting enabled fully automatic engagements, apart from putting shells into the feed to the machine fuze setter.

Ammunition

Initially, there were HE and shrapnel shells, both fitted with a time fuse. Fuse No.199 was igniferous (i.e. powder-burning) with a maximum running time of 30 seconds. Fuses No. 106 and 107 were mechanical time fuses; both proved unsatisfactory. Fuse No. 208, with a maximum running time of 43 seconds, became the standard fuse. A great improvement in 1942 was the introduction of Machine Fuse Setter No. 11, on Mounting Mk. IIC and Carriage Mk. IIIA, which raised the rate of fire to 20 rounds per minute. The introduction of the VT fuse later in the war further increased the gun's effectiveness, and was particularly useful against the V-1 flying bomb.

Ordnance variants

Mk I
Monobloc barrel.

Mk II
Barrel changed to loose liner.

Mk III
The Mk III started as a combination of the Mk I breech with the Mk II barrel.

Mk IV
A prototype development of the 3.7-inch gun using the QF 4.5-inch naval gun Mk V barrel with a liner to give a gun using a  size cartridge case to drive the  shell. The barrel wear proved excessive and it was dropped in favour of the Mk VI.

Mk V
Similar to the Mk IV. Also dropped in favour of the Mk VI.

Mk VI
Like the Mk IV this was based on the 4.5 inch barrel design lined down to 3.7 inches, and using the 4.5 inch size cartridge. However, Colonel Probert changed the barrel to have gradual rifling: the rifling groove depth decreased to zero over the last five calibres of the barrel before the muzzle. This smoothed the two driving bands of a new design shell giving reduced air resistance and hence better ballistic performance, and causing far less barrel wear. It was mounted on the Mounting Mk IIA and therefore deployed in static emplacements only. In service from 1944 to 1959.

Performance
The gun's effective ceiling varied depending on the predictor and fuse. The Mk VI ordnance significantly increased the potential effective ceiling. The British definition of effective ceiling at the start of World War II was "that height at which a directly approaching target at 400 mph can be engaged for 20 seconds before the gun reaches 70° elevation"

From 1943, radar direction of mechanically slaved 3.7" AA batteries was deployed in Kent. This was to address V1 bombs, which at that time flew from permanent launch sites. Batteries were sited to cover those routes and had good success. 

Like other British guns, the 3.7 had a secondary direct fire role for defending its position against tank attack. During the North African Campaign, the 3.7 was considered for use explicitly as an anti-tank weapon due to the shortage of suitable anti-tank guns. Sighting arrangements were improved for the anti-tank role, but the weapon was far from ideal. Its size and weight - two tons heavier than the German Flak 8.8 cm - made it tactically unsuitable for use in forward areas. The mounting and recuperating gear were also not designed to handle the strain of prolonged firing at low elevations.

The 3.7 found little use as a dedicated anti-tank gun except in emergencies. There were few 3.7-equipped heavy anti-aircraft regiments in the field army and most were not subordinate to divisions where the anti-tank capability was required. The arrival of the smaller 76 mm (3-inch) calibre 17-pdr anti-tank gun finally obviated the need.

Like the rival Flak 8.8, the 3.7-inch also proved to be a useful high-velocity medium artillery piece. Using the 207 or VT fuse allowed the gunners to deliver precise airbursts above targets such as enemy batteries or mortar positions. However, repeated firing at low angles increased the wear on the gun and mounting. HAA units sometimes operated with the Army Groups Royal Artillery of medium and heavy guns, and were employed as siege artillery at the siege of Dunkirk. By the time of Operations Veritable and Plunder (the Rhine crossing) in early 1945, HAA regiments were fully integrated into corps-level fire plans.

The Ordnance QF 32 pounder was developed from the 3.7-inch gun and armed the Tortoise self-propelled gun. Canada also experimented with mounting the 3.7-inch gun on the Ram tank chassis. Neither vehicle saw service.

Operators

 
 : 12
 
 
 
 
 
 
 
 : Unspecified number captured from British forces, as 94mm Flak Vickers M.39(e)
 : 45 still in service
 : Royal New Zealand Artillery

 
 
 
  as part of the Polish II Corps within the British 8th Army

Weapons of comparable role, performance and era
 8.8 cm Flak 18/36/37/41 : contemporary German anti-aircraft gun, firing a lighter (20 pound) shell
 90 mm Gun M1 : contemporary US anti-aircraft gun, firing a lighter (22 pound) shell
 Cannone da 90/53 : contemporary Italian anti-aircraft gun, firing a lighter (23 pound) shell
 85 mm air defense gun M1939 (52-K) : contemporary Soviet anti-aircraft gun, firing a lighter (20 pound) shell

References

Notes

Bibliography

External links

36th Heavy Air Defence Regiment website

Anti-aircraft guns of the United Kingdom
World War II artillery of the United Kingdom
World War II anti-aircraft guns
94 mm artillery
Military equipment introduced in the 1930s